The 2015 International Cup of Nice was the 20th edition of an annual international figure skating competition held in Nice, France. It was held on October 14–18, 2015. Medals were awarded in the disciplines of men's singles, ladies' singles, pair skating, and ice dancing on the senior level, and in singles on the junior level.

Senior results

Men

Ladies

Pairs

Ice dancing

Junior results

Men

Ladies

External links
 Official site
 Starting orders and results

Coupe Internationale de Nice
Cup of Nice, 2015
Cup of Nice